Ara the Handsome ( Ara Gełec‘ik) is a semi-legendary Armenian hero and king. Ara is notable in Armenian literature for the popular legend in which he was so handsome that the Assyrian queen Semiramis waged war against Armenia to capture him and bring him back to her, alive.

Ara is sometimes associated Arame of Urartu, who ruled the Kingdom of Urartu Biainili during the 9th century BC.

Genealogy 
In Movses Khorenatsi's History of Armenia, Ara the Handsome is presented as the son of Aram and a descendant of Hayk, the legendary forefather of the Armenians. Khorenatsi writes that Ara the Handsome had a son, also named Ara, by his wife, Nuard (Nvard). Ara, son of Ara, who was twelve years old at the time of his father's death, was appointed ruler of Armenia by Semiramis and later died in a war against her.

Legend 
According to the legend, Semiramis (Shamiram in Armenian) had fallen in love with the handsome Armenian King and asked him to marry her. When Ara refused, Semiramis, in the heat of passion, gathered the armies of Assyria and marched against Armenia. During the battle Semiramis was victorious, but Ara was slain despite her orders to capture him alive. To avoid continuous warfare with the Armenians, Semiramis, reputed to be a sorceress, took his body and prayed to the gods to raise Ara from the dead. When the Armenians advanced to avenge their leader, Semiramis disguised one of her lovers as Ara and spread the rumor that the gods had brought Ara back to life, convincing the Armenians not to continue the war. In one persistent tradition, Semiramis' prayers are successful and Ara returns to life. During the 19th century, it was also reported that a village called Lezk, near Van, traditionally held that it was Ara's place of resurrection.

Connection to Plato's Myth of Er

Scholars have connected the story of Ara the Handsome to the Myth of Er, told in Plato's Republic (10.614–10.621). The story begins as a man named Er (/ɜːr/; Greek: Ἤρ, gen.: Ἠρός), son of Armenios (Ἀρμένιος), of Pamphylia dies in battle. When the bodies of those who died in the battle are collected, ten days after his death, Er remains undecomposed. Two days later he revives on his funeral-pyre and tells others of his journey in the afterlife, including an account of reincarnation and the celestial spheres of the astral plane. The tale includes the idea that moral people are rewarded and immoral people punished after death.

Armen Petrosyan suggests that Plato's version reflects an earlier form of the story where Er (Ara) rises from the grave.

See also 
Hayk
Armenian mythology

References

Bibliography 

 

 

Armenian mythology